Mamonas Assassinas is the only studio album released by the Brazilian rock band of same name. It was released in 1995, and in only eight months (until the end of the band), it sold more than 2 million copies.

Background and recording 
Rick Bonadio — nicknamed by the band "Creuzebek" — was chosen to produce the band's debut album. However, their record label EMI wanted at least ten tracks and the band hand only three in hands. In a week the bandmates wrote other 12 tracks that made the cut, but "Não Peide Aqui Baby", a parody of The Beatles's "Twist and Shout", was shelved due to the amount of profanity in the lyrics. The recording took place in São Paulo, on Bonadio's studio, and was mixed at The Enterprise in Los Angeles, United States.

Artwork 
The band created the concept of the cover, a drawing by Carlos Sá in which the musicians appear in front of a naked woman exposing large breasts (evoking the pun in the band's name, "mamona" as in "mama", breast in Portuguese), inspired by the Playboy issue featuring Brazilian model Mari Alexandre.<ref>{{cite web|url=http://extra.globo.com/tv-e-lazer/capa-da-playboy-que-inspirou-cd-dos-mamonas-assassinas-mari-alexandre-fala-pela-primeira-vez-18763711.html|title=Capa da "Playboy" que inspirou CD dos 'Mamonas Assassinas', Mari Alexandre fala pela primeira vez|language=portuguese}}</ref> EMI later demanded that the band be featured on the cover as well.

 Track listing 

1406
Satirises "as seen on TV" sales strategies. The title is a reference to the phone number of one of such services, well known in Brazil at the time. The song also includes several English words such as money, good, work, have, and play. The latter 3 being conjugated in Portuguese as verbs, like "Workando" meaning "working".

Vira-Vira
A Vira-styled song (inspired by the songs of Portuguese singer Roberto Leal), pokes fun at the meaning of the word suruba (meaning "orgy"), which is mistaken for something else by a Portuguese couple.

Pelados em Santos

Satyrises shallow commercial music, custom cars and the way Latinos are viewed by Americans.

Chopis Centis
Parody of the main riff of The Clash's "Should I Stay or Should I Go" (with scatological sounds replacing Mick Jones' guitar fills) and pokes fun at the difficulties faced by North-Easterners in São Paulo due to cultural differences. Part of the fun of the song derives from its criticism of shopping centers.

Jumento Celestino
A forró parody, tells the story of a man from Bahia coming to "Sum Paulo" in his donkey – which he compares to a car, including installing a stereo.

Sabão Crá-Crá
A nursery rhyme about toilet soap and men's intimate parts. It is a public domain song.

Uma Arlinda Mulher
A lovesong in reverse, describing an ugly woman instead of a pretty one. Imitates MPB singer Belchior, whose deep voice and serious tone add fun to the clueless lyrics. The title is a take on the Brazilian translation of "Pretty Woman" ("Uma Linda Mulher").

Cabeça de Bagre II
Pokes fun at punks, mostly by saying that they are utterly unintelligent blokes who can't finish their schooling. The title is a possible pun on Titãs' Cabeça Dinossauro.

Mundo Animal
A series of heavy/dirty jokes about disgusting sexual or scatological facts of animal behavior. Talks about the size of elephant's genitalia or the absence of morals on dogs, as well as implying Camels "carry their balls on their backs."

Robocop Gay
Spoofs the film character RoboCop and transgender males. RoboCop's implants and cybernetics are compared to the transgender's surgeries and implants. Also pokes fun at religions, including a paradoxical chorus saying that homosexuals are everywhere (even among Muslims and Neo-Nazis) and that they should not be mistreated.

Bois Don't Cry
The title parodies The Cure's "Boys Don't Cry" but the lyrics and the music follow the bolero style. Makes fun of a flamboyant macho man who suffers impotent as the woman he loves cheats on him. Features a short synthesizer sequence off Rush's "Tom Sawyer" and "The Mirror" from Dream Theater.

Débil Metal
Sung in mock English, in a Max Cavalera-like tone to accompany the heavy metal style of the song, which was closely associated to Sepultura at the time, is a spoof of heavy metal music. The lyrics apparently convey the message that heavy metal fans cannot understand what their idols sing.

Sábado de Sol
The surrealistic tale of a meal among friends which ends up disrupted by hungry marijuana smokers. It's a cover of the band "Baba Cósmica"

Lá vem o Alemão
Satyrised pop-samba music (pagode), about a poor man whose girl left him for an alemão ("German", a slang term for white, wealthy people). The title also parodies the song "Lá Vem o Negão" (Here Comes the Black Guy'') from samba group Cravo e Canella, which was a hit just two years before the album's release. The song also features well-known pagode musicians doing additional instrumental work: Fabinho from Negritude Júnior and Leandro Lehart from Art Popular.

Commercial performance 
The album is the 9th best-selling album of all time in Brazil amongst national artists, and the third best-selling album of the 1990s. The album broke several records previously unseen before in the country, and it remains to this day as the best-selling debut album ever in Brazil, as well as the fastest-selling album in a single day in the country, seeling 25,000 copies in just 12 hours. At one point, it sold 50,000 copies per day, 100,000 copies every two days, which granted a Gold certification at the time, and it went on to sell more than 350,000 copies in a week. In less than 100 days the album had sold 1 million copies, doubling that number by December 1995. With 2 million copies sold in just six months, it became the fastest selling album of all time in Brazil. The band dominated Brazilian radio stations and received overall acclaim, making them legends in history of Brazilian music.

Personnel
Dinho – vocals, acoustic guitar in "Uma Arlinda Mulher"
Bento Hinoto – electric and acoustic guitar, backing vocals
Samuel Reoli – bass guitar, backing vocals
Júlio Rasec – keyboards, backing vocals, co-lead vocal in "Vira Vira" and "Uma Arlinda Mulher"
Sérgio Reoli – drums
Paquito – trumpet in "Pelados em Santos"
César do Acordeom – accordion in "Jumento Celestino"
Fabinho – percussion in "Lá Vem o Alemão"
Leandro Lehart – cavaquinho in "Lá Vem o Alemão"
Rick Bonadio – Additional keyboards, triangle in "Jumento Celestino", wah-wah pedal

Album certification

See also
 List of best-selling albums in Brazil
 List of best-selling Latin albums

References

1995 albums
Mamonas Assassinas albums
Albums produced by Rick Bonadio